Glademir Mendoza (born October 4, 1999) is an American soccer player who plays for UCF Knights as a defender. Mendoza had previously played for New Mexico.

Career
Mendoza appeared for USL side Real Monarchs on June 4, 2018 as an 85th-minute substitute in a 2–0 win over Rio Grande Valley FC Toros.

Mendoza committed to play college soccer at the University of New Mexico for the 2018 NCAA Division I men's soccer season. Following the disbandment of the New Mexico soccer program, Mendoza transferred to the University of Central Florida. During his sophomore year, he was named to the all-Rookie team for the American Athletic Conference. He finished the 2019 season with 18 appearances and an assist.

References

External links

1999 births
Living people
Association football defenders
American soccer players
New Mexico Lobos men's soccer players
Real Monarchs players
Soccer players from Phoenix, Arizona
UCF Knights men's soccer players
USL Championship players